Sense is a charitable organization based in the United Kingdom.  The charity exists to support people who are deafblind or who have a hearing or vision impairment and another disability and campaigns for the rights of disabled people in the UK. It operates in England, Northern Ireland and Wales.

The charity's full name is Sense, The National Deafblind and Rubella Association but its operating name is Sense. It was previously called The National Deafblind and Rubella Association.

Charitable services 
The charity offers a range of services for disabled people including residential services, advice and information and arts and sports activities.  It also offers education services to young people with complex learning disabilities.  It also provides a residential holiday scheme for disabled children. Sense also supports people in the UK affected by Usher syndrome.

Campaigning and advocacy work 
Sense also campaigns for the rights of disabled people to take part in life.

Children's play campaign 
This activity included a 2016 campaign that highlighted that many disabled children were excluded from playgrounds and other children's play activities.  This included an inquiry into children's play activities in the UK and a report called The Case for Play.

Sense Sign School 
In 2020, the charity ran an educational campaign called Sense Sign School to increase understanding of British Sign Language (BSL). This campaign promoted free online lessons in BSL taught by a teenager living with CHARGE syndrome.

Campaigning on exclusion and social isolation 
In 2021, Sense campaigned to highlight the exclusion and social isolation of disabled people during the COVID-19 pandemic. The charity was also involved in highlighting the abuse of a woman and her deafblind sister for removing a face mask. Sense also published a report about exclusion and social isolation among disabled people that highlighted the barriers faced by disabled people in everyday life.

Governance and regulation 
Sense is a charitable company registered with the Charity Commission.  It is also regulated by the Care Quality Commission, Ofsted (Office For Standards In Education) and Care Inspectorate Wales (CIW).

Royal patronage 
Princess Anne, the Princess Royal is the patron of Sense. In December 2020, Princess Anne was thanked for her work by a disabled teenager supported by Sense.

Guinness World Record 
Sense is notable for holding the world's largest tactile signing lesson. This took place in London on 2 October 2018 and involved 390 participants.

References 

Charities for disabled people based in the United Kingdom
Measles
Rubella
Campaigning
Deafblindness